The Five Nations Railway Corridor or Five States Railway Corridor is a proposed rail link in Central Asia between Iran in the west, through Afghanistan, Tajikistan, Kyrgyzstan, and reaching China in the east. Around half of the length of the railway would pass through northern Afghanistan. A preliminary agreement for the railway link was first signed in 2014, with costs estimated at US$2 billion, however construction of the main section through Afghanistan is uncertain due to the ongoing conflict in Afghanistan.

Background 
In 2007, work started on an Iranian government funded railway connecting Khaf in Iran across the border with Herat in Afghanistan. This line is part of the proposed railway route. The section between Khaf and Ghurian (Afghanistan) was inaugurated in 2020. A railway link between Afghanistan's northern border town of Hairatan and southern Uzbekistan opened in 2011, but has only been used incidentally for trains originating from China.

Plans for the railway line are supported by the Chinese government, as part of its Belt and Road Initiative, and by Iran, which is becoming an increasingly important trading partner for Afghanistan. The Asian Development Bank has committed funding for the Afghan section of the line.

Impact 
The railway is expected to especially benefit the landlocked Afghanistan, which would gain direct access to the Iranian seaports of Chabahar and Bandar Abbas. Through Iran, the line can connect to the Turkish railway network. Tajikistan and Kyrgyzstan would also benefit from access to Iran's ports, and would reduce their dependency on neighbors Turkmenistan, Uzbekistan and also on Russia.

See also 

 Rail transport in Afghanistan
Mazar-i-Sharif-Kabul-Peshawar railway line

References 

Transport in Afghanistan
Transport in Iran
Transport in Tajikistan
Transport in Kyrgyzstan
Belt and Road Initiative
Proposed rail infrastructure in Asia